"Every Little Thing" is a song co-written and recorded by American country music artist Carlene Carter.  It released in May 1993 as the first single from her album Little Love Letters.  The song reached number 3 on the Billboard Hot Country Singles & Tracks chart in August 1993. It was written by Carter and Al Anderson.

"Every Little Thing" is featured in the Williams Pinball machine Red & Ted's Road Show.

Chart performance

Year-end charts

References

1993 singles
1993 songs
Carlene Carter songs
Songs written by Al Anderson (NRBQ)
Songs written by Carlene Carter
Song recordings produced by Howie Epstein
Giant Records (Warner) singles